Bourlon is a surname. Notable people with the surname include: 

Albert Bourlon (1916–2013), French road cyclist
Axel Bourlon (born 1991), French Paralympic powerlifter
Cyril Bourlon de Rouvre (born 1945), French businessman and politician